Gossler's Park (German: Goßlers Park) is a public park in Blankenese in Hamburg. It is located north of Blankeneser Landstraße and near Blankenese station. The park is named after the Gossler hanseatic banking family. The Goßlerhaus, a white mansion previously owned by the Gosslers, is located in the park.

External links 
 Goßlers Park auf www.hamburg.de

Parks in Hamburg
Altona, Hamburg